Gregor Aichinger (c. 1565 – 21 January 1628) was a German composer.

Life
He was organist to the Fugger family of Augsburg in 1584. In 1599 he went for a two-year visit to Rome for musical, rather than religious reasons, although he had taken holy orders before his appointment under the Fuggers. Proske, in the preface to vol. 2 of his Musica Divina, calls him a priest of Regensburg, and is inclined to give him the palm for the devout and ingenuous mastery of his style. Certainly this impression is fully borne out by the beautiful and somewhat quaint works included in that great anthology.

Notes

References

External links
 

1560s births
1628 deaths
Renaissance composers
German classical composers
German Baroque composers
German classical organists
German male organists
People from Regensburg
17th-century classical composers
German male classical composers
17th-century male musicians
Male classical organists